The 1974–75 season was Cardiff City F.C.'s 48th season in the Football League. They competed in the 22-team Division Two, then the second tier of English football, finishing twenty-first, suffering relegation to Division Three.

Players

  

Source.

League standings

Results by round

Fixtures and results

Second Division

Source

League Cup

FA Cup

UEFA Cup Winners Cup

Welsh Cup

See also
Cardiff City F.C. seasons

References

Bibliography

Welsh Football Data Archive

Cardiff City F.C. seasons
Cardiff City
Card